qsub is an IEEE Std 1003.1-2008 Unix command for submitting jobs to a job scheduler, usually in cluster or grid computing. The qsub command is used to submit jobs to Slurm Workload Manager, to TORQUE, and to Oracle Grid Engine; HTCondor calls it condor_qsub.

References

Job scheduling
Unix